The Canon Law Society of America or CLSA is a professional association dedicated to the promotion of both the study and the application of canon law in the Catholic Church. The Society's membership includes over fifteen hundred men and women who reside in forty-three countries. Not all members are Catholic.

History 

A group of canonists established the Canon Law Society of America on November 12, 1939, in Washington, D.C., as a professional association, dedicated to the promotion of both the study and the application of canon law in the Catholic Church. The Society remains active in study and the promotion of canonical and pastoral approaches to significant issues within the Catholic Church, both the Latin or Roman Catholic Church and the Eastern Catholic Churches. Since its founding, and especially since Pope John XXIII called for the revision of the first Code of Canon Law of 1917, the Society has offered its services in the United States for the revitalization and proper application of church law. On February 13, 1981, the Society incorporated as a non-profit corporation in the District of Columbia.

Structure

Board of Governors
The Society organizes its activities through an annual general meeting, at which time it elects officers and determines resolutions for future study and activity by the Society. A "Board of Governors" oversees the operations of the Society. The Board is composed of elected officers: a president, a vice-president who is president-elect, an immediate past president, a secretary, a treasurer, and six consultors.

Activities
The Society convenes an annual convention and other symposia. Collaboration with other professional church organizations and learned societies is another area of the Society's involvements. Regional meetings of members of the Society also are held periodically across the United States.

The Society publishes various works in order to promote greater understanding and application of canon law.

See also
Canon law of the Catholic Church
1983 Code of Canon Law
Code of Canons of the Eastern Churches
Professional society
The Jurist
Law society
Bar association

References

External links
Official website 
Doctoral Dissertations in Canon Law
Code Of Canon Law Vatican website

Other canon law societies
Canadian Canon Law Society
Canon Law India
Canon Law Society of Australia and New Zealand
Canon Law Society of Great Britain & Ireland
Canon Law Society of the Philippines 
Midwest Canon Law Society (the United States)
Sociedade Brasileira de Canonistas

Academic canon law
Law societies
Law-related professional associations
Law-related learned societies
Legal organizations based in the United States